Belinda Noack (born 20 March 1977) is a former Australian cricketer. A right-arm fast-medium bowler, she is also a right-handed batter. Born in Adelaide, South Australia, she represented her home state in 43 List A matches in the Women's National Cricket League (WNCL) between the 1997–98 and 2002–03 seasons.

References

External links
 
 

1977 births
Living people
Australian cricketers
Australian women cricketers
Cricketers from Adelaide
Sportswomen from South Australia
South Australian Scorpions cricketers